James McGrew (26 January 1822 – 19 January 1911) was an American politician. Between 1865 and 1867 he served as Lieutenant Governor of Kansas.

Life
James McGrew was born in Adams County, Pennsylvania. He attended local Schools. When he was 22 years old he moved with his parents to the Iowa Territory. Later he ran a department store in Lancaster in that territory. In 1857 he came to Wyandotte County, Kansas where he continued to work as a merchant. He joined the Republican Party and in 1859 and 1860 he was a Member of the Legislative of the Kansas Territory. In addition he was twice elected to the office of the Mayor of Wyandotte, which is now a part of Kansas City, Kansas. In 1862 he was elected to the Kansas Senate.

Two years later he won the election for Lieutenant Governor of Kansas. He served in this position between 9 January 1865 and 14 January 1867 when his term ended. In this function he was the deputy of Governor Samuel J. Crawford.  After the end of his term he continued his business as a merchant. He died on 19 January 1911 in Kansas City.

External links
 The Political Graveyard
 
 Online Biography
 Kansas Lieutenant Governors

1822 births
1911 deaths
19th-century American politicians
People from Adams County, Pennsylvania
People from Wyandotte County, Kansas
Businesspeople from Iowa
Businesspeople from Kansas
Mayors of places in Kansas
Republican Party Kansas state senators
Lieutenant Governors of Kansas
19th-century American businesspeople